Stoyko Malov (born 6 June 1943) is a Bulgarian wrestler. He competed in the men's freestyle flyweight at the 1964 Summer Olympics.

References

External links
 

1943 births
Living people
Bulgarian male sport wrestlers
Olympic wrestlers of Bulgaria
Wrestlers at the 1964 Summer Olympics
Place of birth missing (living people)